Jeux d'eau is a piece for solo piano by Maurice Ravel, composed in 1901 and given its first public performance the following year. The title is variously translated as "Fountains", "Playing Water" or literally "Water Games". At the time of writing Jeux d'eau, Ravel was a student of Gabriel Fauré, to whom the piece is dedicated. The work is in a single movement, typically lasting between four and half and six minutes in performance. 

The piece is known for its virtuosic, fluid, and highly evocative nature, and is considered one of Ravel's most important works for piano.  The piece is characterized by its fast, shimmering, and cascading piano figurations, which are meant to evoke the sound of flowing water. The overall atmosphere of "Jeux d'eau" is one of lightness, playfulness, and sensuousness, and the piece is often described as a musical depiction of the joy and beauty of nature. "Jeux d'eau" is considered a masterful example of Ravel's distinctive style, which is characterized by its clarity, precision, and sensitivity to color and texture.

Background and first performances
In 1901 Maurice Ravel was aged 26 and had yet to make an impression on the French musical scene. He had failed to win any prizes as a student at the Paris Conservatoire and was expelled on that account. As a former student he was permitted to attend the classes of his teacher Gabriel Fauré, who thought highly of him and encouraged him. Ravel dedicated Jeux d'eau and his String Quartet "à mon cher maître Gabriel Fauré".

Jeux d'eau represented what Ravel's biographer Gerald Larner calls "a sudden surge in Ravel's imagination" after the mostly unremarkable compositions that preceded it. The piece was partly inspired by Franz Liszt's Les jeux d'eau à la Villa d'Este (from his Années de pèlerinage). Another inspiration may have been the poem "Fête d'eaux" by Ravel's friend Henri de Régnier. It contains the line "Dieu fluvial riant de l'eau qui le chatouille" ("river god laughing at the water that tickles him"), which at the composer's request the poet inscribed on Ravel's manuscript, and is the heading in the printed score.

Ravel gave the first performance of the work at a gathering of the avant-garde artistic group Les Apaches of which he was a member. The pianist Vlado Perlemuter quoted one of those present as saying, "There was a strange fire, a whole panoply of subtleties and vibrations which none of us could previously have imagined". Perlemuter commented that the piece "opens up new horizons in piano technique, especially if one remembers that Debussy's Jardins sous la pluie was not written until two years later, in 1903". The work was published by Eugène Demets in 1901. It was quickly denounced by musical conservatives, including Camille Saint-Saëns − who dismissed it as "total cacophony" − and most of the faculty of the Conservatoire.

The first public performance was given by the pianist Ricardo Viñes in a concert presented by the Société nationale de musique on 5 April 1902, at which Ravel's Pavane pour une infante défunte was also premiered. Pierre Lalo, the music critic of Le Temps (who later became persistently hostile to Ravel) was favourably impressed. After commending Viñes's "singular virtuosity and delicacy" he praised the two Ravel works as "orderly, composed with great clarity and measure, while keeping the same refinement in harmony". He continued:

Ravel's biographer Arbie Orenstein comments that among the other critics and the public the Pavane was found elegant and charming, but Jeux d'eau was thought to be cacophonic and excessively complicated. "It now appears that the Pavane is a minor work, as the composer himself acknowledged, while Jeux d'eau is firmly established as an important landmark in the literature of the piano".

Music

The piece, in E major, is in a single movement. It opens "tres doux", with a metronome marking of ♪=144. The duration of the piece varies considerably in performance, from 4½ minutes to more than 6..
Orenstein summarises the structure: "the opening and closing sonorities of Jeux d'eau are the chord of the major seventh, which enjoys a privileged position throughout". In Orenstein's analysis the work is based on two themes, the second of which is pentatonic, "treated quite freely". After an extensive development section, the two themes return and the work ends in "a sweeping cascade" of hemidemisemiquavers. Ravel makes pronounced use of the higher and lower register of the keyboard.

Recordings
Recordings of Jeux d'eau include:

From the 78 r.p.m. era:
Robert Casadesus (1928)
Benno Moiseiwitsch (1929)
Alfred Cortot (1931)
Eileen Joyce (1941)

From the mono LP era:
Vlado Perlemuter (1955)
Sviatoslav Richter (1954)
Walter Gieseking (1955)

From the stereo LP era:
Martha Argerich (1961)
Samson François (1967)
Jacques Février 1971 
Pascal Rogé (1975)
Jean-Philippe Collard (1980)

From the CD era:
Jean-Yves Thibaudet (1985)
Louis Lortie (1989)
Pierre-Laurent Aimard (2011)
Hélène Grimaud (2016).
Bertrand Chamayou (2016)

Notes, references and sources

Notes

References

Sources

External links

Jeux d'eau performed by Beau Pluto

1901 compositions
Compositions by Maurice Ravel
Music dedicated to students or teachers
Compositions for solo piano
Compositions in E major